South Korea competed at the 1972 Summer Paralympics in Heidelberg, West Germany.

Medalists

Archery

Athletics

Dartchery

Table tennis

Individual competition

Team competition
Men's Teams 2 — Preliminaries 

Men's Teams 3 — Preliminaries 

Men's Teams 4 

 —

References

 IPC

Nations at the 1972 Summer Paralympics
1972
Paralympics